Dicastillo (n) is a town and municipality located in the province and autonomous community of Navarre, northern Spain. Dicastillo is a village in Navarra. It is near Estella.

Demographics 
There are 691 people in Dicastillo. They work on the farms, the stone factory, in shops and the winery. Other people work in other villages, such as Allo, Arróniz, etc. The shops in Dicastillo number 6. There is a market on Monday to buy clothes, meat and sweets. People go to Estella or Pamplona to buy things that cannot be found in the village such as computers and furniture.

Festivals 
The Dicastillo festivals are in August and a key appeal is the music. There are other festivals such as: San Blas, on 3 of February, the Asparagu's day is in spring, blood donor's day in winter.

Facilities
In Dicastillo there are pubs, a pelota court, a cafe, a school, bus station, a swimming pool, park, a doctor, a church, a chemist (pharmacy), palace and the retired people's club. The important buildings in Dicastillo are the hermitage and the church from the 16th century. There is also a palace from the 19th century. The palace has been converted into a restaurant and a winery. People in Dicastillo like music. There is an important music band called Banda Bizkarra. It has existed for 53 years and formed by 30 musicians. Near Dicastillo, there are other villages such as Arellano. There is also a town near Dicastillo called Estella. In Estella there is a bus station, two supermarkets and a hospital.
Dicastillo has varied scenery, a notable mountain, Montejurra, and the Ega River where people can fish. There is much farmland devoted to the growing of wheat and maize.

External links
 DICASTILLO in the Bernardo Estornés Lasa - Auñamendi Encyclopedia (Euskomedia Fundazioa) 
 Official web of the town 

Municipalities in Navarre